Miss Brazil 1999 was the 45th edition of the Miss Brazil pageant. It was held on 8 April 1999 at Scala Rio in Rio de Janeiro, Rio de Janeiro State, Brazil and was hosted by Deise Nunes. Michella Marchi of Mato Grosso do Sul crowned her successor Renata Fan of Rio Grande do Sul at the end of the event. Fan represented Brazil at the Miss Universe 1999 pageant. 1st Runner-Up, Paula Carvalho of Rio de Janeiro, represented Brazil at Miss World 1999 and 2nd Runner-Up, Alessandra Nascimento of Minas Gerais, represented the country at Miss International 1999.

Results

Special Awards

Contestants
The delegates for Miss Brazil 1999 were:

 - Gleiciane da Silva Gattas Dias
 - Elena Cristina Bomfim da Silva
 - Luciana Alves dos Santos
 - Joice Lima Barros
 - Maria Carolina Magnavita Oliveira
 Brasília - Barbara Kelly Cezar Fonseca
 - Geisa Jinkings de Oliveira
 - Kátia Peterle Camargos
 - Thays Bittencourt
 - Amélia Cristina Araújo Ferreira
 - Karine Bonatto
 - Mirian Jackeline Stech Pavão
 - Alessandra Ferreira do Nascimento
 - Renata Karolyne Brasil França
 - Juliana Pereira Luna
 - Marken Maria Valerius
 - Jadilza Bernardo de Carvalho
 - Lilyan de Melo Barros
 - Paula de Souza Carvalho
 - Tatiana Santos
 - Renata Bomfiglio Fan
 - Priscila Giacomolli
 - Thelma Silva de Araújo
 - Aline Schmitt Crescêncio
 - Melissa Naldinho Coelho Barbosa
 - Fernanda Lacerda de Souza
 - Luziane Baierle

References

External links 
Official Miss Brasil Website

1999
1999 in Brazil
1999 beauty pageants